Ha Eun-ju (born August 12, 1986) is a South Korean swimmer, who specialized in freestyle events. She won a bronze medal, as a member of the South Korean team, in the 4×200 m freestyle relay (8:19.62), when her nation hosted the 2002 Asian Games in Busan.

Ha qualified for the women's 400 m freestyle, as a 17-year-old, at the 2004 Summer Olympics in Athens. She eclipsed a FINA B-standard entry time of 4:20.56 from the Dong-A Swimming Tournament in Seoul. She challenged seven other swimmers on the second heat, including Jamaica's Janelle Atkinson, who finished fourth in Sydney (2000). She raced to seventh place by 0.07 of a second behind New Zealand's Rebecca Linton in 4:21.65. Ha failed to reach the top 8 final, as she placed thirty-second overall in the preliminaries.

References

1986 births
Living people
Olympic swimmers of South Korea
Swimmers at the 2004 Summer Olympics
Swimmers at the 2002 Asian Games
Asian Games medalists in swimming
South Korean female freestyle swimmers
Asian Games bronze medalists for South Korea
Medalists at the 2002 Asian Games
21st-century South Korean women